Diaphorus is a genus of flies in the family Dolichopodidae. Lyroneurus is considered by some authors to be a subgenus of this genus.

Species

Diaphorus abruptus Van Duzee, 1931
Diaphorus adumbratus Parent, 1931
Diaphorus africus Parent, 1924
Diaphorus alacer Parent, 1934
Diaphorus alamaculatus Yang & Grootaert, 1999
Diaphorus albiciliatus Van Duzee, 1915
Diaphorus alienus Van Duzee, 1915
Diaphorus alligatus (Walker, 1856)
†Diaphorus alsiosus (Meunier, 1910)
Diaphorus amazonicus Parent, 1930
Diaphorus amoenus Aldrich, 1902
Diaphorus amplus Curran, 1926
Diaphorus anatoli Negrobov, 1986
Diaphorus angusticinctus De Meijere, 1916
Diaphorus anomalus Parent, 1937
Diaphorus antennatus Van Duzee, 1915
Diaphorus apicalis De Meijere, 1910
Diaphorus apiciniger Yang & Saigusa, 2001
Diaphorus aptatus Becker, 1922
Diaphorus argenteotomentosus (Kertész, 1901)
Diaphorus argentifacies Van Duzee, 1932
Diaphorus argentipalpis Van Duzee, 1923
Diaphorus athenae Liu & Yang in Liu, Bian, Zhang & Yang, 2018
Diaphorus australis Van Duzee, 1915)
Diaphorus baechlii Naglis, 2010
Diaphorus baheensis Liu, Wang & Yang, 2015
Diaphorus bakeri Robinson, 1967
Diaphorus basalis Van Duzee, 1915
Diaphorus basicinctus Parent, 1941
Diaphorus basiniger Yang & Grootaert, 1999
Diaphorus becvari Olejnicek, 2005
Diaphorus bezzii Parent, 1925
Diaphorus biprojicientis Wei & Song, 2005
Diaphorus biroi Kertész, 1901
Diaphorus bisetus Yang & Grootaert, 1999
Diaphorus blandus Parent, 1934
Diaphorus brevimanus Van Duzee, 1931
Diaphorus brevinervis Van Duzee, 1924
Diaphorus brunneus Loew, 1858
Diaphorus californicus Van Duzee, 1917
Diaphorus canus Robinson, 1964
Diaphorus centriflavus Yang & Grootaert, 1999
Diaphorus chamaeleon Becker, 1922
Diaphorus chrysotus Parent, 1928
Diaphorus cilipes Olejnicek, 2005
Diaphorus cilitibia Parent, 1933
Diaphorus cinctellus De Meijere, 1910
Diaphorus coaptatus Parent, 1932
Diaphorus comiumus Wei & Song, 2005
Diaphorus communis White, 1916
Diaphorus condignus Becker, 1922
Diaphorus connexus Wei & Song, 2005
Diaphorus consanguineus Harmston & Knowlton, 1963
Diaphorus contiguus Aldrich, 1896
Diaphorus costaricensis Parent, 1934
Diaphorus dasycnemus Loew, 1858
Diaphorus delegatus Walker, 1856
Diaphorus deliquescens Loew, 1871
Diaphorus denticulatus Wei & Song, 2006
Diaphorus despectus Parent, 1939
Diaphorus detectus Becker, 1922
Diaphorus dimidiatus Aldrich, 1896
Diaphorus dioicus Wei & Song, 2006
Diaphorus discrepans Becker, 1922
Diaphorus disjunctus Loew, 1857
Diaphorus distinctus Parent, 1932
Diaphorus distinguendus Parent, 1928
Diaphorus divergens Parent, 1939
Diaphorus dolichocerus Stackelberg, 1947
Diaphorus dorsalis Verrall, 1876
Diaphorus dubius Aldrich, 1896
Diaphorus dyeri Van Duzee, 1931
Diaphorus ealensis Parent, 1937
Diaphorus edwardsi Van Duzee, 1930
Diaphorus elongatus Yang & Grootaert, 1999
Diaphorus emeiensis Liu & Yang in Liu, Tang, Liang & Yang, 2017
Diaphorus exarmatus Parent, 1932
Diaphorus exunguiculatus Parent, 1925
Diaphorus exungulatus Parent, 1935
Diaphorus felinus Parent, 1939
Diaphorus femoratus Walker, 1852
Diaphorus flavipilus Becker, 1922
Diaphorus fulvifrons Parent, 1939
Diaphorus funeralis Parent, 1929
Diaphorus fuscus Van Duzee, 1921
Diaphorus garnetensis Bickel, 2013
Diaphorus genuinus Parent, 1927
Diaphorus gibbosus Van Duzee, 1915
Diaphorus gracilis Parent, 1929
Diaphorus graecus Parent, 1932
Diaphorus gredleri Mik, 1881
Diaphorus guangdongensis Wang, Yang & Grootaert, 2006
Diaphorus habilis Becker, 1922
Diaphorus hadesusi Liu & Yang, 2017
Diaphorus hainanensis Yang & Saigusa, 2001
Diaphorus halteralis Loew, 1869
Diaphorus hebeiensis Yang & Grootaert, 1999
Diaphorus henanensis Yang & Saigusa, 2000
Diaphorus hilaris Meuffels & Grootaert, 1985
Diaphorus hirsutipes Becker, 1922
Diaphorus hirsutus Van Duzee, 1921
Diaphorus hoffmannseggi Meigen, 1830
Diaphorus impiger Becker, 1922
Diaphorus incumbens (Becker, 1924)
Diaphorus infumatus Parent, 1933
Diaphorus inglorius Parent, 1933
Diaphorus inornatus Van Duzee, 1917
Diaphorus insufficiens Curran, 1925
Diaphorus insulanus Van Duzee, 1930
Diaphorus intactus Becker, 1922
Diaphorus intermedius Robinson, 1964
Diaphorus intermixtus Becker, 1922
Diaphorus iowensis Robinson, 1964
Diaphorus jacobsi Parent, 1922
Diaphorus jeanae Hollis, 1964
Diaphorus jinghongensis Wang, Yang & Grootaert, 2006
Diaphorus jingpingensis Yang & Saigusa, 2002
Diaphorus junctus Van Duzee, 1917
Diaphorus karijini Bickel, 2013
Diaphorus laffooni Robinson, 1964
Diaphorus lamellatus Loew, 1864
Diaphorus lateniger Parent, 1939
Diaphorus latifacies Van Duzee, 1932
Diaphorus lautus Loew, 1869
Diaphorus lavinia Curran, 1926
Diaphorus lawrencei Curran, 1926
Diaphorus leigongshanus Wei & Yang, 2007
Diaphorus leucostoma Loew, 1861
Diaphorus lichtwardti Parent, 1925
Diaphorus lividiventris (Becker, 1924)
Diaphorus lividus Parent, 1941
Diaphorus livingstonei Vanschuytbroeck, 1964
Diaphorus longicornis Olejnicek, 2005
Diaphorus longilamellus Harmston, 1971
Diaphorus longinervis Van Duzee, 1931
Diaphorus longiseta Wang, Yang & Grootaert, 2006
Diaphorus longrenensis Liu, Wang & Yang, 2015
Diaphorus ludibundis Parent, 1932
Diaphorus luteipes Parent, 1925
Diaphorus magnipalpis Van Duzee, 1930
Diaphorus mandarinus Wiedemann, 1830
Diaphorus maurus Osten Sacken, 1882
Diaphorus medusae Liu & Yang in Liu, Bian, Zhang & Yang, 2018
Diaphorus meijeri Parent, 1933
Diaphorus melanopterus Selivanova & Negrobov, 2009
Diaphorus menglunanus Yang & Grootaert, 1999
Diaphorus mengyanganus Yang & Grootaert, 1999
Diaphorus merlimontensis Parent, 1922
Diaphorus millardi Meuffels & Grootaert, 1999
Diaphorus minor De Meijere, 1916
Diaphorus modestus Parent, 1931
Diaphorus monyx Meuffels & Grootaert, 1985
Diaphorus morio De Meijere, 1924
Diaphorus nanpingensis Yang & Saigusa, 2001
Diaphorus neimengguensis Liu & Yang in Liu, Bian, Zhang & Yang, 2018
Diaphorus neotropicus Parent, 1928
Diaphorus niger Vanschuytbroeck, 1951
Diaphorus nigerrimus De Meijere, 1913
Diaphorus nigrescens Aldrich, 1901
Diaphorus nigribarbatus Parent, 1932
Diaphorus nigricans Meigen, 1824
Diaphorus nigrihalteralis Van Duzee, 1931
Diaphorus nigripedus Liu, Wang & Yang, 2015
Diaphorus nigripennis Van Duzee, 1932
Diaphorus nigrotibia Strobl, 1893
Diaphorus nitidulus Parent, 1927
Diaphorus nudus Van Duzee, 1917
Diaphorus obscurus Parent, 1933
Diaphorus ochripes Becker, 1924
Diaphorus oculatus (Fallén, 1823)
Diaphorus oldenbergi Parent, 1925
Diaphorus ozerovi Selivanova, Negrobov & Maslova, 2011
Diaphorus parapraestans Dyte, 1980
Diaphorus parenti Stackelberg, 1928
Diaphorus parmatus Van Duzee, 1915
Diaphorus parthenus (Hardy & Kohn, 1964)
Diaphorus pauperculus Parent, 1935
Diaphorus pilitibius Negrobov & Maslova, 2005
Diaphorus pilosus Parent, 1932
Diaphorus plumicornis De Meijere, 1913
Diaphorus pollinosus De Meijere, 1910
Diaphorus praeustus Meuffels & Grootaert, 1985
Diaphorus protervus Becker, 1922
Diaphorus pruinosus Parent, 1930
Diaphorus pseudopacus Robinson, 1964
Diaphorus pulvillatus Meuffels & Grootaert, 1985
Diaphorus pusio De Meijere, 1916
Diaphorus putatus Parent, 1925
Diaphorus qingchengshanus Yang & Grootaert, 1999
Diaphorus qinlingensis Yang & Saigusa, 2005
Diaphorus quadridentatus Yang & Saigusa, 2000
Diaphorus remulus Van Duzee, 1915
Diaphorus repletus Parent, 1928
Diaphorus resumens Walker, 1858
Diaphorus rita Curran, 1926
Diaphorus robinsoni Runyon, 2020
Diaphorus rostratus (Bigot, 1890)
Diaphorus ruiliensis Wang, Yang & Grootaert, 2006
Diaphorus salticus Yang & Saigusa, 2002
Diaphorus sanguensis Hollis, 1964
Diaphorus satellus Becker, 1922
Diaphorus schoutedeni Curran, 1925
Diaphorus secundus Becker, 1922
Diaphorus sequens Becker, 1922
Diaphorus serenus Becker, 1922
Diaphorus setifer De Meijere, 1916
Diaphorus setosus White, 1916
Diaphorus seyrigi Parent, 1934
Diaphorus shaanxiensis Liu & Yang in Liu, Bian, Zhang & Yang, 2018
Diaphorus siamensis Parent, 1935
Diaphorus similis Van Duzee, 1915
Diaphorus simulans Becker, 1922
Diaphorus slossonae Van Duzee, 1932
Diaphorus snowi Van Duzee, 1917
Diaphorus sparsus Van Duzee, 1917
Diaphorus spinitalus Van Duzee, 1923
Diaphorus stylifer Parent, 1933
Diaphorus suae Liu & Yang in Liu, Tang, Liang & Yang, 2017
Diaphorus subjacobsi Negrobov, 2005
Diaphorus sublautus Negrobov, 2007
Diaphorus submixtus Becker, 1922
Diaphorus subsejunctus Loew, 1866
Diaphorus tadzhikorum Negrobov & Grichanov, 2005
Diaphorus tangens Parent, 1935
Diaphorus tenebricoflavus Liu & Yang in Liu, Tang, Liang & Yang, 2017
Diaphorus tenuipes Parent, 1929
†Diaphorus tertiarius Meunier, 1907
Diaphorus tetrachaetus Parent, 1933
Diaphorus texanus Van Duzee, 1932
Diaphorus translucens De Meijere, 1916
Diaphorus triangulatus Yang & Saigusa, 2002
Diaphorus tridentatus Yang & Saigusa, 2000
Diaphorus tristis (Loew, 1858)
Diaphorus trivittatus Van Duzee, 1915
Diaphorus ultimus Becker, 1922
Diaphorus unguiculatus Parent, 1925
Diaphorus unicolor Becker, 1922
Diaphorus ussuriensis Stackelberg, 1928
Diaphorus vagans Becker, 1922
Diaphorus varifrons Becker, 1918
Diaphorus varipes Van Duzee, 1929
Diaphorus varitibia Parent, 1932
Diaphorus ventralis Van Duzee, 1915
†Diaphorus venustus (Meunier, 1907)
Diaphorus versicolor Van Duzee, 1932
Diaphorus viduus Parent, 1930
Diaphorus virescens Thomson, 1869
Diaphorus vitripennis Loew, 1859
Diaphorus vulsus Van Duzee, 1917
Diaphorus walkeri Parent, 1934
Diaphorus winthemi Meigen, 1824
Diaphorus wonosobensis De Meijere, 1916
Diaphorus xizangensis Yang & Grootaert, 1999
Diaphorus zlobini Negrobov & Dukhanina, 1987

Unrecognised species:
Diaphorus concinnarius (Say, 1829)
Diaphorus cyanocephalus Meigen, 1824 (= Brachypus coeruleocephalus Megerle (nomen nudum))
Diaphorus proveniens (Walker, 1859)

The following species are synonyms or have been moved to other genera:
Diaphorus amicus Parent, 1931: Moved to Chrysotus
Diaphorus angustifrons Robinson, 1975: Moved to Chrysotus
Diaphorus bimaculatus Macquart, 1827: synonym of D. oculatus (Fallén, 1823)
Diaphorus ciliatus Becker, 1922: Moved to Chrysotus
Diaphorus consimilis Parent, 1937: synonym of D. nigricans Meigen, 1824
Diaphorus flavipes Aldrich, 1896: moved to Chrysotus
Diaphorus flavocinctus Meigen, 1824: synonym of D. oculatus (Fallén, 1823)
Diaphorus hamatus Parent, 1931: Moved to Chrysotus
Diaphorus inversus Curran, 1924: Synonym of D. dasycnemus Loew, 1858
Diaphorus latifrons Loew, 1857: Moved to Asyndetus
Diaphorus lugubris Loew, 1857: synonym of D. nigricans Meigen, 1824 (?)
Diaphorus luteipalpus Parent, 1929: Moved to Chrysotus
Diaphorus maculatus (Parent, 1930): Moved to Chrysotus
Diaphorus maculipennis Robinson, 1970: Synonym of Chrysotus maculatus (Parent, 1934)
Diaphorus mediotinctus Becker, 1922: Moved to Chrysotus
Diaphorus minimus Meigen, 1830: Synonym of Chrysotus gramineus (Fallén, 1823)
Diaphorus munroi Curran, 1926: Moved to Trigonocera
Diaphorus oblongus Parent, 1928: Moved to Chrysotus
Diaphorus parvulus Aldrich, 1896: moved to Chrysotus
Diaphorus propinquus Becker, 1922: Moved to Chrysotus
Diaphorus robustus Robinson, 1975: Moved to Chrysotus
Diaphorus rutshuruensis Vanschuytbroeck, 1951: Synonym of D. niger Vanschuytbroeck, 1951
Diaphorus superbiens Parent, 1931: Synonym of Chrysotus ciliatus (Becker, 1922)
Diaphorus upembaensis Vanschuytbroeck, 1952: Synonym of D. insufficiens Curran, 1925
Diaphorus vicinus Becker, 1922: Moved to Chrysotus
Diaphorus vittatus Van Duzee, 1915: Synonym of Chrysotus leucostoma (Loew, 1861)
Diaphorus wirthi Robinson, 1975: Moved to Chrysotus

The following species are considered nomina nuda:
†Diaphorus fernandi Meuffels & Grootaert, 1999 (replacement name for Dolichopus soccatus Meunier, 1899, nec Walker, 1849, a nomen nudum)
†Diaphorus modestus Keilbach, 1982 (also preoccupied by D. modestus Parent, 1931)

References 

Dolichopodidae genera
Diaphorinae
Taxa named by Johann Wilhelm Meigen